Topographia Germaniae (1642 – c. 1660s) is a multi-volume series of books created by engraver Matthäus Merian and writer Martin Zeiler, and published in Frankfurt in 38 parts. Engravers Wenceslaus Hollar, Caspar Merian, and Matthäus Merian Jr. also contributed illustrations. In the 1960s Bärenreiter-Verlag reproduced the work.

Volumes
  
 Contents: Switzerland; index
  
 Contents: Swabia, including Augsburg; index
  
 Contents: Alsace, includes Strassburg, etc.; index
 
 Contents: Bavaria; index
  
 Contents: Rhine Palatinate; index
 
 Contents: Archdioceses of Mainz, Trier and Cologne; index
 
 Contents: Hesse, including Frankfurt etc.; index
  
 Contents: Westphalia, including Aachen etc.; index
  
 Contents: Franconia, including Nuremberg etc.; index
  
 Contents: Austria; index
  
 Contents: Bohemia, Moravia and Silesia, including Prague etc.; index
 1960 reprint
  
 Contents: Upper Saxony, Thuringia, Meissen and Lusatia, including Dresden, etc.; index
  
 Contents: Brandenburg and Pomerania, including Berlin, Riga etc.; index
 
 Contents: Lower Saxony, including Hamburg, Lubeck; index
  
 Contents: Brunswick and Lüneburg
  
 Contents: Burgundy, including Brussels etc.;  index

References

Further reading

External links

 Wikisource

Geographic history of Germany
1640s books
History books about Germany
Geography books
1640s in the Holy Roman Empire
1650s in the Holy Roman Empire